Giuseppe L'Abbate (born 13 March 1985) is an Italian politician.

Political career 
He was elected to the Chamber of Deputies in 2013 and re-elected in 2018 for the Five Star Movement.

He was State Secretary at the Ministry of Agricultural, Food and Forestry Policies in the Conte II Cabinet.

In 2022 he left the Five Star Movement with Luigi Di Maio. He is the political manifesto coordinator for Together for the Future for the 2022 Italian general election.

References 

1985 births
Living people
Together for the Future politicians

21st-century Italian politicians
Deputies of Legislature XVII of Italy
Deputies of Legislature XVIII of Italy
University of Bari alumni
Conte II Cabinet
Government ministers of Italy